Ana Christensen is an American-born, Australian singer-songwriter, best known for her 1990 single "Isolate Your Heart".

Background
Ana Christensen was born in California in 1960 and moved to Australia in the late 1970s.

Christensen first started singing in Townsville, Queensland in 1980, first as a soloist then with Michael Heytman. In 1986, Christensen won Female Vocal, Gospel Solo, Bush Ballad Duo with Michael and the overall Grand Prize at the Charters Towers Country Music Festival.

This resulted in a tour with Freddy Fender and Ayr's Saddle Tramps in June 1986. In 1987, Heytman and Christensen once again won the Duo at Charters Towers, and Christensenalso took out first place in Female Vocal.

In 1988, Christensen released her debut album, Deep in the Night and in early 1990, she signed to CBS. Through CBS, she released the album Brave New World in 1990.

In 1994, Christensen moved to be with her family in the United States and left the music industry.

Discography

Studio albums

Singles

References

Living people
Australian women pop singers
20th-century Australian women singers
Australian women singer-songwriters
Year of birth missing (living people)